The Midland Railway (MR) 3835 Class is a class of 0-6-0 steam locomotive designed for freight work.  The first two were introduced in 1911 by Henry Fowler. After the grouping in 1923 they continued to be built up to 1941 by the LMS as the LMS Fowler Class 4F.

History
A total of 197 engines were built. 192 of them were sequentially numbered 3835–4026 for the Midland Railway. After nationalisation in 1948 British Railways added 40000 to their numbers so they became 43835–44026. Five engines were constructed by Armstrong Whitworth for the Somerset and Dorset Joint Railway in 1922, numbered 57–61. They were absorbed into LMS stock in 1930, becoming 4557–4561.

Accidents and incidents
On 19 November 1926, locomotive No. 3980 was one of two hauling a freight train. A signal post was partly brought down, obstructing an adjacent line. The carriages of an express passenger train had their sides ripped open by the signal post. Eleven people were killed.
On 6 March 1930, locomotive No. 4009 was hauling a ballast train that was in collision with a passenger train at  station, Cumberland. The passenger train had departed from  against signals. Two people were killed and four were seriously injured.

Withdrawal

The 197 engines in this class were withdrawn between 1954 and 1965 as follows:

Preservation

One Midland-built 4F, (4)3924 is preserved on the Keighley and Worth Valley Railway, the first locomotive to leave Woodham Brothers scrapyard in Barry, South Wales in September 1968. Three LMS-built 4Fs have also been preserved.

Models 

Bachmann Branchline 3835 Class in OO gauge, which was also adapted into Graham Farish N gauge model.

Hornby introduced a OO gauge model of 3924 in 2022 to celebrate the film "Return of the Railway Children" which featured this locomotive. The model is in a variation of LMS unlined black.

References

External links

Class 4F-B Details at Rail UK

3835
Somerset and Dorset Joint Railway locomotives
0-6-0 locomotives
Armstrong Whitworth locomotives
Railway locomotives introduced in 1911
Standard gauge steam locomotives of Great Britain